The 2019 Free State provincial election was held on 8 May 2019, concurrently with the 2019 South African general election, to elect the 30 members of the Free State Provincial Legislature.

The election was won by the African National Congress, the incumbent governing party in the province.

Premier candidates
The African National Congress (ANC) did not announce a premier candidate before the election. Provincial chairperson Sam Mashinini was first on the ANC's list with incumbent premier Sisi Ntombela third on the list. After the election, Ntombela was announced as the party's premier candidate and she was elected for another term at the first sitting of the legislature after the election.

The Democratic Alliance (DA) chose Patricia Kopane, a two-term Member of Parliament and its leader in the Free State. She defeated Coreen Malherbe for the position.

The Economic Freedom Fighters (EFF) did not field a premier candidate, since the party seeks to abolish provincial governments. Mandisa Makesini appeared first on the party's list.

The Freedom Front Plus (FF Plus) selected their incumbent provincial leader and former member of the provincial legislature, Jan van Niekerk.

Results

Aftermath
During the first sitting of the provincial legislature on 22 May 2019, Sisi Ntombela was re-elected as premier, while Zanele Sifuba was elected speaker, and Vusi Tshabalala was appointed chief whip.

References

2019 elections in South Africa